T. Tamilvannan is a Tamil film director. His notable movies are Kalvanin Kadhali and Machakaaran.

He started his career as an Assistant Director with the top Tamil industry director Ezhil in the superhit film of actor Vijay "Thullada Manamum Thullum", followed by the film with actor Prabhu Deva "Pennin Manathai Thottu" and continued as Co-Director in the film of Actor Ajith Kumar "Poovellam Un Vasam" and "Raja". His Directorial debut film was "Kalvanin Kadhali" acted by the actor S.J.Suryah and the leading star "Nayantara" which was also a box office hit. He done the second film "Machakaran" with the actor Jeevan and the third film titled "Nandhi"

After a good script work now he has signed his next project with Bollywood super star Amitabh Bachchan and S.J.Suryah in bilingual film titled Uyarntha Manidhan.

Filmography

References

Indian film directors
Tamil-language film directors